Abdelkader Moutaa is a Moroccan actor.

Filmography

Feature films 
 Wechma (1970)
 El Chergui (1975)
 The Bandits (2003)
  Rbib  (2004)
 The Man Who Sold the World (2008)

References

External links 
 

20th-century Moroccan male actors
21st-century Moroccan male actors
Year of birth missing (living people)
Living people